Moussa Seydi (born 21 August 1996) is a Senegalese professional footballer who plays for Luxembourgian club Jeunesse Esch as a forward.

Club career
Seydi transferred to Metz from the Senegalese academy of Génération Foot in 2014. He made his senior debut for Metz in a 3–0 Ligue 1 loss against FC Girondins de Bordeaux on 21 September 2016.

In July, Seydi signed a three-year deal with CS Fola Esch in Luxembourg. For the truncated 2019–20 Luxembourg National Division season, Seydi was voted as the best player by Luxembourg sporting website Mental.lu, having scored thirteen goals in sixteen appearances.

At the start of December 2020, Seydi joined Orléans after a trial, signing an 18 month contract.

On 30 January 2022, Seydi returned to Luxembourg and signed with Jeunesse Esch.

International career
Seydi is a youth international for Senegal. He scored the tournament winning goal for the Senegal U23 at the 2015 African Games - Men's tournament

References

External links
 
 
 

Living people
1996 births
People from Sédhiou Region
Association football forwards
Senegalese footballers
Senegal youth international footballers
Génération Foot players
FC Metz players
CS Fola Esch players
US Orléans players
Jeunesse Esch players
Ligue 1 players
Championnat National players
Championnat National 2 players
Championnat National 3 players
Luxembourg National Division players
Senegalese expatriate footballers
Expatriate footballers in France
Senegalese expatriate sportspeople in France
Expatriate footballers in Luxembourg
Senegalese expatriate sportspeople in Luxembourg